The northeastern interior dry–mesic oak forest is a forest system found in Maine, Vermont, New Hampshire, Massachusetts, Connecticut, Rhode Island, New York, New Jersey, Ohio, Pennsylvania, Maryland, Virginia, and West Virginia. These forests cover large areas at low and middle elevations, typically on flat to gently rolling terrain.

Tree types
Common oaks are red oak (Quercus rubra), white oak (Quercus alba), and black oak (Quercus velutina). Other trees include hickories (Carya spp.), red maple (Acer rubrum), sugar maple (Acer saccharum), white ash (Fraxinus americana), tulip tree (Liriodendron tulipifera), American beech (Fagus grandifolia), black cherry (Prunus serotina), black birch (Betula lenta), black tupelo (Nyssa sylvatica), and American elm (Ulmus americana). Flowering dogwood (Cornus florida) is a common understory tree.

Shrubs
Common shrubs are maple-leaved viburnum (Viburnum acerifolium), spicebush (Lindera benzoin), and witch hazel (Hamamelis virginiana). In sandier or more acidic soils are mountain laurel (Kalmia latifolia), blueberry (Vaccinium pallidum), huckleberry (Gaylussacia baccata), and swamp azalea (Rhododendron viscosum).

Mayapple (Podophyllum peltatum) is a common herbaceous plant.

See also
 Central Appalachian dry oak–pine forest

References

Appalachian forests

Plant communities of the Eastern United States
Temperate broadleaf and mixed forests in the United States